Brudekronen (The Bridal Crown) is a 1944 Norwegian drama film directed by Walter Fyrst, starring Carl Habel, Trygve Svendsen and Ingrid Lysaker. The film is about the two half-brothers Knut (Svendsen) and Aasmund (Habel) and their family farm, Storlien. Knut is the heir, and wants to demolish the old houses that Aasmund love, to build hotels. There is also a romantic rivalry in their fight over the girl Inga (Lysaker).

External links
 
 Brudekronen at Filmweb.no (Norwegian)

1944 films
1944 drama films
Norwegian drama films
Norwegian black-and-white films
1940s Norwegian-language films